Christopher Brinchmann (1 April 1864 – 26 February 1940) was a Norwegian archivist, literary historian and critic.

He was born at Leka in Nord-Trøndelag, Norway.   He worked in the National Archival Services of Norway (Riksarkivet) from 1896, and was deputy director from 1922 to 1934. He was among the publishers of Diplomatarium Norvegicum. Among his own works were Nationalforskeren P. A. Munch; hans liv og virke (1910), Grønlands overgang til Danmark (1922), Norske kongesigiller (1924) and Norges arkivsaker i Danmark (1927). He also edited the periodical Kringsjaa, from 1898 to 1907.

References

1864 births
1940 deaths
People from Leka, Norway
20th-century Norwegian historians
Norwegian archivists
Norwegian literary historians
Norwegian literary critics
19th-century Norwegian journalists
20th-century Norwegian journalists